Medasina is a genus of moths in the family Geometridae. The Global Lepidoptera Names Index lists it as a junior subjective synonym of Chorodna. Species are distributed throughout India, Sri Lanka and Myanmar.

Description
Palpi upturned and fringed with hair. Antennae of male bipectinate (comb like on both sides) to three-fourths of their length. Abdomen of male clothed with long hair below. Wings with crenulated (scalloped) margin. Forewings with vein 3 from before angle of cell and veins 7 to 9 stalked from before upper angle. Vein 10 from cell, sometimes connected with veins 8 and 9. Vein 11 given off from vein 12, which rarely anastomosing with vein 10. Hindwings with vein 3 from near angle of cell.

References

Geometridae